Radar Patrol vs. Spy King is a 1949 12-chapter black-and-white spy film serial produced and distributed by Republic Pictures from an original, commissioned screenplay collaboratively written by Royal K. Cole, William Lively and Sol Shor.  Kirk Alyn played the lead.

Plot
John Baroda, a neo-Nazi and his alter ego, The Spy King and his aide Nitra, are part of a sabotaging team for a vast defense system of radar stations along the US borders. Radar Defense Bureau operative Chris Calvert comes to the rescue of radar scientist, Joan Hughes, who has been kidnapped by Baroda's henchmen...

Cast
 Kirk Alyn as Chris Calvert
 Jean Dean as Joan Hughes
 John Merton as John Baroda/Spy King
 George J. Lewis as Lt Manuel Agura
 Eve Whitney as Nitra
 Anthony Warde as Ricco
 Stephen Gregory as Hugo
 Tristram Coffin as Franklin Lord

Production
Radar Patrol vs. Spy King was budgeted at $164,970 although the final negative cost was $164,632 (a $338, or 0.2%, under spend).  It was filmed between 20 September and 12 October 1949.  The serial's production number was 1706.

Stunts
Tom Steele as Chris Calvert & Ricco Morgan (doubling Kirk Alyn & Anthony Warde)
Dale Van Sickel Chris Calvert, Ricco Morgan & Lt Manuel Agura (doubling Kirk Alyn, Anthony Warde and George J. Lewis)
David Sharpe as Lt Manuel Agura (doubling George J. Lewis)

Special effects
The special effects were created by the Lydecker brothers.

Release

Theatrical
Radar Patrol vs. Spy King'''s official release date is November 23, 1949, although this is actually the date the sixth chapter was made available to film exchanges.  This was followed by a re-release of Undersea Kingdom instead of a new serial.  The next new serial, The Invisible Monster'', followed in spring of 1950.

Chapter titles
 The Fatal Fog (20min)
 Perilous Trail (13min 20s)
 Rolling Fury (13min 20s)
 Flight of the Spy King (13min 20s)
 Trapped Underground (13min 20s)
 Wheels of Disaster (13min 20s)
 Electrocution (13min 20s)
 Death Rings the Phone (13min 20s)
 Tomb of Terror (13min 20s)
 Death Dive (13min 20s) - a re-cap chapter
 Desperate Mission (13min 20s)
 Day of Reckoning (13min 20s)
Source:

See also
 List of film serials
 List of film serials by studio

References

External links

 
Radar Patrol vs. Spy King at Todd Gault's Movie Serial Experience

1949 films
American black-and-white films
1940s English-language films
Republic Pictures film serials
American spy films
Films directed by Fred C. Brannon
1940s spy films
1940s American films